Sorbiers may refer to the following places in France:

 Sorbiers, Hautes-Alpes, a commune in the department of Hautes-Alpes
 Sorbiers, Loire, a commune in the department of Loire

See also 
 Sorbier (disambiguation)